The FIA Formula One Esports Series is a professional esports programme promoted by Formula 1. The programme was created in 2017 to involve the official Formula 1 video game and its community of players, providing a new avenue for greater engagement with the sport of Formula 1. In 2018, the official Formula 1 teams joined the programme for the first time to set up their own esports teams to compete in the Formula 1 Esports Series championship.

In response to the Coronavirus epidemic, that caused the postponement or cancellation of several Formula 1 Grand Prix races, the Virtual Grand Prix Series was held in the first half of 2020, with current and former F1 racers taking part, as well as athletes from other sports, celebrities, and content creators. The first Virtual Grand Prix was held on March 22, won by Zhou Guanyu. A total of eight Virtual Grands Prix were held, with George Russell crowned unofficial champion, after taking four victories. A condensed three-race Virtual Grand Prix series also took place during pre-season in 2021.

History
The first Formula One Esports Series was announced on 21 August 2017, with the qualification and finals stages to be held on the official Formula 1 video game of the 2017 championship. Over 60,000 gamers participated in the inaugural series, watched by 123 countries around the world and generating over 20 million impressions on social media. Brendon Leigh of the UK was the first champion of the series.

2018 was Formula 1's first full season in esports and was split into 2 stages. In the first stage that opened in April 2018, online racers were offered the incredible opportunity to earn a place on the official esports driver line-up for one of the official F1 teams. Mercedes AMG Petronas Motorsport, Red Bull Racing, Force India F1 Team, Williams, Renault Sport F1 Team, Haas F1 Team, McLaren, Toro Rosso and Alfa Romeo Sauber F1 Team all offered positions in their esports driver line ups as part of the series inaugural Pro Draft. Over 66,000 gamers participated to vie for a spot in the official F1 teams' esports team who competed in the F1 New Balance Esports Series and a chance to win a share of the $200,000 prize fund. The series drew a record audience of 5.5million across selected TV networks and live streams online. Mercedes took the 2018 Team Championship and Brendon Leigh became two-time Driver Champion.

On 8 April 2019, Formula 1 announced the third instalment of the F1 Esports Series, with an increased prize fund of $500,000. Ferrari joined the series after choosing not to take part the year prior. The series was won by David Tonizza, driving for Ferrari Driver Academy, with Red Bull Racing Esports taking the Constructors' Trophy.

In 2020, to take the place of the 2020 Formula One World Championship, Formula 1 launched the "Virtual Grand Prix", with races being the Bahrain, Australian, Brazilian, Spanish, Monaco, Azerbaijan and Canadian Grands Prix, a series for entertaining F1 fans while the season is disrupted. The Virtual GP began with the Virtual Bahrain Grand Prix, with Zhou Guanyu as the inaugural winner. The series ended with the Virtual Canadian Grand Prix. In addition to Zhou, F1 drivers George Russell, Charles Leclerc and Alex Albon won the other virtual races. George Russell with 146 unofficial points won the series with Albon as runner-up at 108 points. These events were also supported by Formula Two with Arthur Leclerc crowned as unofficial champion by four points ahead of Louis Deletraz having taken more pole positions following the Canadian Grand Prix.

After a delayed start due to the COVID-19 pandemic, Formula 1 announced the fourth instalment of the series on August 13 2020. In response to the pandemic, drivers and teams were required to work at home or at their team factories. The prize fund was further increased to $750,000. Jarno Opmeer of Alfa Romeo Racing ORLEN F1 Esports was crowned driver's champion, with Red Bull Racing Esports retaining their Constructors' crown. The series drew a further record audience of 11.4m live stream views across all digital platforms, representing a 98% increase on 2019.

The Virtual Grand Prix was again held during the winter break before the 2021 Formula One World Championship, but this time, the races are run in the Formula 2 format: a Feature Race and a Sprint Race. In the Sprint Race, the official F1 Esports drivers race first, and their finishing position will determine the starting grid of the Feature Race. The Feature Race has gamers from different disciplines ranging from sim racing to real life racing. There is a charity prize fund, for which the teams will be competing to get the biggest share, based on their constructors championship position. The second Virtual Grand Prix season started with the Virtual Austrian Grand Prix, which was won by Enzo Fittipaldi, brother of Pietro Fittipaldi, who recently raced in F1 in real life for the Haas F1 Team. The Virtual British Grand Prix was won by George Russell. Russell went on to win the final race, the Virtual Sao Paulo Grand Prix, making it his sixth consecutive win. Haas F1 Team won the series, with Enzo Fittipaldi the unofficial driver's champion.

Format

 Qualification - The season opens with online qualification, a global call for participation. Qualification is open to players who own a copy of the official Formula 1 video game developed by Codemasters. Players with the fastest times advance to the next phase.
 Pro Draft - Qualified players enter the Pro Draft, where the official Formula 1 teams select which players to represent them in the F1 Esports Pro Series championships.
 Pro Series - All participating players race in 25-50% races over a series of events that are broadcast live. They earn points for themselves and their F1 teams. These points count towards the championship, after which the winning team and player will be crowned the F1 New Balance Esports Series Teams’ and Drivers’ World Champions respectively, with a portion of the prize fund distributed to the teams based on their standings.

Results

Personal results (since 2018 format)

References

External links

eSports